The ferruginous babbler (Pellorneum bicolor) is a species of bird in the family Pellorneidae.
It is found in Brunei, Indonesia, Malaysia, Myanmar, and Thailand.
Its natural habitat is subtropical or tropical moist lowland forests.

References

Collar, N. J. & Robson, C. 2007. Family Timaliidae (Babblers)  pp. 70 – 291 in; del Hoyo, J., Elliott, A. & Christie, D.A. eds. Handbook of the Birds of the World, Vol. 12. Picathartes to Tits and Chickadees. Lynx Edicions, Barcelona.

ferruginous babbler
Birds of Malesia
ferruginous babbler
Taxonomy articles created by Polbot
Taxobox binomials not recognized by IUCN